The 1988–89 Gamma Ethniki was the sixth season since the official establishment of the third tier of Greek football in 1983. Edessaikos was crowned champion, thus winning promotion to Beta Ethniki. Sparti and Eordaikos were also won promotion as a runner-up and a third placed team of the league.

League table

References

Third level Greek football league seasons
3
Greece